Haplorchis is a genus of intestinal flukes in the family Heterophyidae.

Species include:
 Haplorchis popelkae
 Haplorchis pumilio
 Haplorchis taichui
 Haplorchis vagabundi
 Haplorchis yokogawai

References 

Heterophyidae
Digenea genera